TWD is the currency code of the New Taiwan dollar (NT$), the official currency of the Taiwan Area of the Republic of China.

TWD may also refer to:

 Jefferson County International Airport (IATA airport code: TWD), Jefferson County, State of Washington, USA
 Texting while driving, the act of composing, sending, or reading text messages, email, or making other similar use of the internet on a mobile device, while operating a motor vehicle
 Tiger Woods Design, golf course design company
 True wind direction, see Apparent wind in sailing
 Tsuen Wan District, a district of New Territories, Hong Kong
 Tweants dialect (ISO 639 language code: twd)
 The Walking Dead (disambiguation)
 The Winery Dogs, an American rock supergroup
 Wings Aviation (ICAO airline code: TWD), Nigerian airline

See also

 Syrian National Democratic Alliance (TWDS)